is a professional Japanese baseball player. He is a pitcher for the Chunichi Dragons of Nippon Professional Baseball (NPB).

References 

1998 births
Living people
Nippon Professional Baseball pitchers
Baseball people from Nagoya
Chunichi Dragons players